The following people were all born in or were residents of the city of Akron, Ohio, United States. 

Jalen Hudson (born 1996), American basketball player in the Israeli Basketball Premier League

Fictional people from Akron, Ohio
Jiminy Glick - fictional talk-show host portrayed by Martin Short on film and TV
J.Reid, in In Too Deep, played by Omar Epps

References

Akron
Akron, Ohio